Mepe is a town in the Volta Region of Ghana. The town is known for the St. Kizito Secondary Technical.  The school is a second cycle institution. The people of Mepe celebrate the Afenotor Festival.

References

Populated places in the Volta Region